Tiglath-Pileser II (from the Hebraic form  of Akkadian Tukultī-apil-Ešarra) was King of Assyria from 967 BCE, when he succeeded his father Ashur-resh-ishi II, until his death in 935 BCE, when he was succeeded by his son Ashur-dan II. Little is known about his reign.

History
Tiglath-Pileser II waged numerous successful military campaigns, including against the Babylonians, the Arameans, and the Hittites. He conquered the region of Nairi, which lay between Assyria and Urartu, and gained control of the lucrative trade routes that passed through the area.

Tiglath-Pileser II also reorganized the Assyrian army and introduced new military tactics and weapons. He established a standing army that was well-equipped and well-trained, which allowed him to maintain control over his empire and to expand it further.

In addition to his military conquests, Tiglath-Pileser II made significant political reforms. He reorganized the administrative structure of the Assyrian Empire and introduced a system of provincial governors, who were responsible for collecting taxes and maintaining order in their regions. He also standardized weights, measures, and currency throughout the empire, which facilitated trade and commerce.

Tiglath-Pileser II is remembered as one of the most powerful and influential kings of Assyria. His military and political reforms laid the foundation for the later Assyrian Empire, which would become one of the most formidable empires of the ancient world.

See also

Tiglath-Pileser I
Tiglath-Pileser III

Footnotes

References

935 BC deaths
10th-century BC Assyrian kings
Year of birth unknown